Kochetok is a rural locality (a khutor) in Bolshezhirovsky Selsoviet Rural Settlement, Fatezhsky District, Kursk Oblast, Russia. Population:

Geography 
The khutor is located on the Bolshaya Kuritsa River (a right tributary of the Seym River), 107 km from the Russia–Ukraine border, 32 km north-west of Kursk, 15 km south-east of the district center – the town Fatezh, 7 km from the selsoviet center – Bolshoye Zhirovo.

 Climate
Kochetok has a warm-summer humid continental climate (Dfb in the Köppen climate classification).

Transport 
Kochetok is located 7.5 km from the federal route  Crimea Highway as part of the European route E105, 17 km from the road of regional importance  (Kursk – Ponyri), on the road  (Fatezh – 38K-018), 22.5 km from the nearest railway halt 517 km (railway line Oryol – Kursk).

The rural locality is situated 33 km from Kursk Vostochny Airport, 155 km from Belgorod International Airport and 220 km from Voronezh Peter the Great Airport.

References

Notes

Sources

Rural localities in Fatezhsky District